Wabcz-Kolonia  is a village in the administrative district of Gmina Stolno, within Chełmno County, Kuyavian-Pomeranian Voivodeship, in north-central Poland. It is located in Chełmno Land within the historic region of Pomerania.

Transport
The Polish National road 55 passes through the village.

References

Villages in Chełmno County